Spencer may refer to:

People
Spencer (surname)
Spencer family, British aristocratic family
List of people with surname Spencer
Spencer (given name), a given name (including a list of people with the name)

Places

Australia
Spencer, New South Wales, on the Central Coast
Spencer Gulf, one of two inlets on the South Australian coast

United States
Spencer, Idaho
Spencer, Indiana
Spencer, Iowa
Spencer, Massachusetts
Spencer (CDP), Massachusetts
Spencer, Missouri
Spencer, Nebraska
Spencer, New York
Spencer (village), New York
Spencer, North Carolina
Spencer, Ohio
Spencer, Oklahoma
Spencer, South Dakota
Spencer, Tennessee
Spencer, Virginia
Spencer, West Virginia
Spencer, Wisconsin
Spencer (town), Wisconsin
Spencer County, Indiana
Spencer County, Kentucky

Ireland
Spencer Dock, North Wall, Dublin

Arts and entertainment

Fictional characters
Spencer, character in Beyblade
Spencer, character from Final Fantasy Mystic Quest
Spencer family (General Hospital), on General Hospital
Spencer, on Hallo Spencer
Spencer (Pinocchio 3000), from Pinocchio 3000
Spencer, railway engine in Thomas the Tank Engine
Spencer Hastings, in Pretty Little Liars
Spencer Strasmore, from Ballers
Spencer Shay, from iCarly
Dr. Spencer Reid on Criminal Minds
Ozwell E. Spencer in Resident Evil game franchise
Frank Spencer, principal character in British TV sitcom Some Mothers Do 'Ave Em
Oliver Spencer, in American TV series The Six Million Dollar Man
Spencer Olham, in 2001 film Impostor
Shawn Spencer, in the American comedy series Psych

Works of art
 Spencer (album), a 2013 album by Spencer Albee
 Spencer (film), a 2021 drama film about Princess Diana
 Spencer (TV series), a 1984–1985 American sitcom

Businesses
 Spencer's (department store), a department store chain in British Columbia, Canada (1873 to 1948)
 Spencer Gifts, a retail chain in the United States and Canada

Maritime and military
 Spencer repeating rifle, a U.S. Army weapon popular from the American Civil War through the Plains Indian Wars
 Spencer or trysail, a small low sail used to maintain control of a sailing vessel in very high winds
 , a 74-gun third-rate ship of the line of the Royal Navy
 , a ship that sailed with HMS Esperance

Other uses
 Spencer (clothing), a type of short jacket
 Spencer Carriage House and Stable, listed on the National Register of Historic Places in Washington, D.C.
 Spencer steak, another name for rib eye steak
 Spencer's 15-Points, a series of weights to perform moving average smoothing

See also
Spenser (disambiguation)
Spencer Township (disambiguation)